Tiziano Tagliani (born 10 March 1959 in Ferrara) is an Italian politician.

He is a member of the Democratic Party and he was elected Mayor of Ferrara on 23 June 2009. Tagliani was re-elected for a second term on 28 May 2014.

He served as President of the Province of Ferrara from 2014 to 2018.

Tagliani is married to Paola Cristofori, daughter of former minister Nino Cristofori.

See also
2009 Italian local elections
2014 Italian local elections
List of mayors of Ferrara

References

External links
 

1959 births
Living people
Mayors of places in Emilia-Romagna
Politicians from Ferrara
Democratic Party (Italy) politicians
Presidents of the Province of Ferrara